For the military use of the airport, see Eagle Pass Army Airfield
Maverick County Memorial International Airport  is a county-owned public use airport in Maverick County, Texas, United States. It is located eight nautical miles (15 km) north of the central business district of Eagle Pass, Texas.

Facilities and aircraft 
Maverick County Memorial International Airport has one asphalt paved runway designated 13/31 which measures 5,506 by 100 feet (1,678 x 30 m). For the 12-month period ending July 28, 2008, the airport had 600 general aviation aircraft operations, an average of 50 per month.

References

External links
 
 

1942 establishments in Texas
Airports established in 1942
Airports in Texas
 
Transportation in Maverick County, Texas